Sven Magnus Øen Carlsen (born 30 November 1990) is a Norwegian chess grandmaster who is the reigning five-time World Chess Champion, four-time World Rapid Chess Champion, and six-time World Blitz Chess Champion. Carlsen has held the  position in the FIDE world chess rankings since 1 July 2011 and trails only Garry Kasparov in time spent as the highest-rated player in the world. His peak rating of 2882 is the highest in history. He also holds the record for the longest unbeaten streak at the elite level in classical chess.

A chess prodigy, Carlsen finished first in the C group of the Corus chess tournament shortly after he turned 13 and earned the title of grandmaster a few months later. At 15, he won the Norwegian Chess Championship, and at 17 he finished joint first in the top group of Corus. He surpassed a rating of 2800 at 18, the youngest at the time to do so. In 2010, at 19, he reached  in the FIDE world rankings, the youngest person ever to do so.

Carlsen became World Chess Champion in 2013 by defeating Viswanathan Anand. He retained his title against Anand the following year and won both the 2014 World Rapid Championship and World Blitz Championship, becoming the first player to hold all three titles simultaneously, a feat which he repeated in 2019 and 2022. He defended his classical world title against Sergey Karjakin in 2016, against Fabiano Caruana in 2018, and against Ian Nepomniachtchi in 2021. Carlsen has declined to defend his title against Nepomniachtchi in 2023.

Known for his attacking style as a teenager, Carlsen has since developed into a universal player. He uses a variety of openings to make it harder for opponents to prepare against him and reduce the utility of pre-game computer analysis. He has stated the middlegame is his favourite part of the game as it "comes down to pure chess".

Childhood 

Carlsen was born in Tønsberg, Norway, on 30 November 1990 to Sigrun Øen, a chemical engineer, and Henrik Albert Carlsen, an IT consultant. The family spent one year in Espoo, Finland, and then in Brussels, Belgium, before returning to Norway in 1998, where they lived in Lommedalen, Bærum. They later moved to Haslum. Carlsen showed an aptitude for intellectual challenges at a young age. At two years, he could solve 500-piece jigsaw puzzles; at four, he enjoyed assembling Lego sets with instructions intended for children aged 10–14.

His father, a keen amateur chess player, taught him to play at age 5, although he initially showed little interest in it. He has three sisters, and in 2010 stated that one of the things that first motivated him to take up chess seriously was the desire to beat his elder sister at the game.

The first chess book Carlsen read was a booklet named Find the Plan by Bent Larsen, and his first book on openings was Eduard Gufeld's The Complete Dragon. Carlsen developed his early chess skills playing by himself for hours on end—moving the pieces around, searching for combinations, and replaying games and positions his father showed him. Simen Agdestein emphasises Carlsen's exceptional memory, stating that he was able to recall the locations, populations, flags and capitals of all the countries in the world by age five. Later, he memorised the locations, populations, coats-of-arms and administrative centres of "virtually all" 356 Norwegian municipalities. He participated in his first tournament—the youngest division of the 1999 Norwegian Chess Championship—at 8 years and 7 months, and scored 6/11.

Carlsen was coached at the Norwegian College of Elite Sport by the country's top player, Grandmaster (GM) Simen Agdestein, who in turn cites Norwegian football manager Egil "Drillo" Olsen as a key inspiration for his coaching strategy. In 2000, Agdestein introduced Carlsen to Torbjørn Ringdal Hansen, a former Norwegian junior champion and later International Master (IM) and Grandmaster (GM), as Ringdal served a one-year siviltjeneste (an alternative civilian service programme) at the college.

Over the course of that year, Carlsen's rating rose from 904 in June 2000 to 1907. Apart from chess, which he studied about three to four hours a day, his favourite pastimes included playing football and reading Donald Duck comics. He also practised skiing until age ten.

From autumn 2000 to the end of 2002, Carlsen played almost 300 rated tournament games, as well as in several blitz tournaments, and participated in other minor events. In October 2002, he placed sixth in the European Under-12 Championship in Peñiscola. The following month, he tied for first place in the 2002 World Under-12 Championship in Heraklion, placing second to Ian Nepomniachtchi on tiebreak. He then obtained three IM norms in relatively quick succession: the first at the January 2003 Gausdal Troll Masters (score 7/10, 2453 PR); the second at the June 2003 Salongernas IM-tournament in Stockholm (6/9, 2470 PR); and the third at the July 2003 Politiken Cup in Copenhagen (8/11, 2503 PR). He was officially awarded the IM title on 20 August 2003.

After finishing primary school, Carlsen took a year off to participate in international chess tournaments in Europe during the autumn of 2003, then returned to complete secondary education at a sports school. During the year away from school, he placed joint-third in the European Under-14 Championship and ninth in the 2003 World Under-14 Championship.

Chess career

2004 

Carlsen made headlines after his victory, at the age of 13, in the C group at the 2004 Corus chess tournament in Wijk aan Zee. He obtained a score of 10½/13, losing just one game (against the highest-rated player of the C group, Duško Pavasovič). Particularly notable was his win over Sipke Ernst in the penultimate round, when he sacrificed material to give mate in just 29 moves. His victory in the C group qualified him to play in the B group in 2005, and it led Lubomir Kavalek, writing for the Washington Post, to give him the title "the Mozart of chess" (although, as pointed out by Edward Winter, the nickname had been given to many illustrious predecessors). Agdestein said that Carlsen had an excellent memory and played an unusually wide range of openings. Carlsen's prowess caught the attention of Microsoft, which became his sponsor.

Carlsen obtained his second GM norm at the Moscow Aeroflot Open in February. On 17 March, in a blitz chess tournament in Reykjavík, Iceland, he defeated former World Champion Anatoly Karpov. It was a preliminary event leading up to a rapid knockout tournament beginning the next day. In that event, Carlsen was paired with Garry Kasparov, then the top-rated player in the world. Carlsen achieved a draw in their first game but lost the second, and was thus knocked out of the tournament.

In the sixth Dubai Open Chess Championship, held 18–28 April, Carlsen obtained his third and final GM norm. It made him the world's youngest GM at the time, and the second-youngest GM in history at the time (after Sergey Karjakin, who earned the title at 12 years and 7 months). Carlsen played in the FIDE World Chess Championship, becoming the youngest player ever to participate in one, but was knocked out in the first round by Levon Aronian.

In July, Carlsen and Berge Østenstad, then the reigning Norwegian champion, tied for first in the Norwegian Chess Championship, each scoring 7/9. A two-game match between them was arranged to decide the title. Both games were drawn, which left Østenstad the champion because he had superior tiebreaks in the tournament.

2005 
In the Smartfish Chess Masters event at the Drammen International Chess Festival 2004–05, Carlsen defeated Alexei Shirov, then ranked  in the world, as well as the co-winner of the tournament. In the semifinals of the Ciudad de León rapid chess tournament in June, Carlsen played a four-game match against Viswanathan Anand, who was ranked  in the world at the time and had won the 2003 World Rapid Chess Championship. Anand won 3–1.

In the Norwegian Chess Championship, Carlsen again finished in shared first place, this time with his mentor Simen Agdestein. A playoff between them was played between 7 and 10 November. This time, Carlsen had the better tiebreaks, but the rule giving the title to the player with better tiebreak scores in the event of a 1–1 tie had been revoked. The match was closely fought—Agdestein won the first game, Carlsen the second—so it went into a series of two-game rapid matches until there was a winner. Carlsen won the first rapid game, Agdestein the second. Then followed three draws until Agdestein won the championship title with a victory in the sixth rapid game.

At the end of 2005, Carlsen participated at the Chess World Cup in Khanty-Mansiysk, Russia. In the knockout tournament, he upset 44th-ranked Zurab Azmaiparashvili in round one, and proceeded to defeat Farrukh Amonatov and Ivan Cheparinov to reach the round of 16. There he lost to Evgeny Bareev, but won against Joël Lautier and Vladimir Malakhov before losing again to Gata Kamsky. Carlsen finished in tenth place and became the youngest player to be an official World Championship Candidate.

2006 
Carlsen qualified for a place in the Corus B group due to his first-place finish in Corus group C in 2004. His shared first place with Alexander Motylev with 9/13 (+6−1=6) qualified him to play in the Corus group A in 2007.

At the 2006 international 'Bosna' tournament in Sarajevo, Carlsen shared first place with Liviu-Dieter Nisipeanu (who won on tiebreak evaluation) and Vladimir Malakhov; this could be regarded as Carlsen's first "A" elite tournament win, although it was not a clear first.

Carlsen was close to winning the 2006 Norwegian Chess Championship outright, but a last-round loss to Berge Østenstad dropped him into another tie for first place with Agdestein. It also prevented Carlsen from beating Agdestein's record as the youngest Norwegian champion ever. Nonetheless, in the playoff held from 19 to 21 September, Carlsen won 3–1. After two draws at standard time controls, Carlsen won both rapid games in round two, securing his first Norwegian championship win.

Carlsen won the Glitnir Blitz Tournament in Iceland. He achieved a 2–0 win over Viswanathan Anand in the semi-finals and achieved the same score in the finals. He scored 6/8 in the 37th Chess Olympiad and achieved a PR of 2820.

In the Midnight Sun Chess Tournament in Tromsø, Carlsen finished second to Sergei Shipov. In the Biel Grandmaster Tournament, he placed second, beating the tournament winner Alexander Morozevich twice.

In the NH Chess Tournament held in Amsterdam in August, Carlsen participated in an "Experience" vs. "Rising Stars" Scheveningen team match. The "Rising Stars" won the match 28–22, with Carlsen achieving the best individual score for the Rising Stars team (6½/10) and a 2700 PR, thus winning the right to participate in the 2007 Melody Amber tournament.

With a score of 7½/15, Carlsen placed 8th out of 16 participants at the World Blitz Championship in Rishon LeZion, Israel. In the rapid chess tournament Rencontres nationales et internationales d'échecs in Cap d'Agde, France, he reached the semi-final, losing there to Sergey Karjakin. In November, Carlsen achieved a shared 8th place of 10 participants in the Mikhail Tal Memorial in Moscow with two losses and seven draws. He finished ninth in a group of 18 participants in the associated blitz tournament, which was won by Anand.

2007 

Playing in the top group of the Corus chess tournament for the first time, Carlsen placed last with nine draws and four losses, scoring 4½/13. In the Linares chess tournament, Carlsen played against top-rated players Veselin Topalov, Viswanathan Anand, Peter Svidler, Alexander Morozevich, Levon Aronian, Peter Leko, and Vasyl Ivanchuk. Despite being rated significantly lower than any of them, he finished in second place on tiebreaks with 7½/14, having scored four wins, seven draws and three losses, and achieving a PR of 2778.

Carlsen played for the first time in the Melody Amber blind and rapid chess tournament in Monte Carlo in March. In the 11 rounds, he achieved eight draws and three losses in the blindfold games, as well as three wins, seven draws and one loss in the rapid games. This resulted in a shared ninth place in the blindfold, shared second place in the rapid (behind Anand), and a shared eighth place overall.

In May and June, he participated in the Candidates Tournament for the FIDE World Chess Championship 2007, facing Levon Aronian in a six-game match at standard time controls, which Carlsen drew (+2−2=2) by coming from behind twice. The four-game rapid playoff was drawn as well (+1−1=2), with Carlsen winning the last game to stay in the match. Eventually, Aronian eliminated Carlsen from the tournament after winning both tiebreak blitz games.

In July and August, Carlsen won the Biel Grandmaster Tournament with a 6/10 record and a PR of 2753. His score was matched by Alexander Onischuk and they played a match to break the tie. After drawing two rapid and two blitz games, Carlsen won the armageddon game. Immediately after the Biel tournament, Carlsen entered the open Arctic Chess Challenge in Tromsø, but his fourth-place result with +5=4 was a slight underperformance in terms of rating. In the first round, Carlsen conceded a draw to his classmate Brede Hagen (rated 2034) after having a lost position at one point. A game which attracted some attention was his sixth-round win over his father, Henrik Carlsen.

Carlsen reached the semi-final round of the World Chess Cup in December, after defeating Michael Adams in the round of 16 and Ivan Cheparinov in the quarterfinals. In the semi-final, he was eliminated by the eventual winner, Gata Kamsky, scoring ½–1½.

2008 

In the top group A of the 69th Corus chess tournament, Carlsen scored 8/13, achieving a PR of 2830. Carlsen won five games, lost two and drew six, sharing first place with Levon Aronian. At the Linares chess tournament, Carlsen had another 2800+ PR, scoring 8/14. He finished in sole second place, ½ point behind the winner World Champion Viswanathan Anand.

In March, Carlsen played for the second time in the Melody Amber blind and rapid chess tournament, held in Nice for the first time. In the 11 rounds he achieved four wins, four draws and two losses in the blindfold, and three wins, two losses, and six draws in the rapid. This resulted in a shared fifth place in the blindfold, shared third place in the rapid and a shared second place in the overall tournament.

Carlsen was one of 21 players in the six-tournament FIDE Grand Prix 2008–2010, a qualifier for the World Chess Championship 2012. In the first tournament, in Baku, Azerbaijan, he finished in a three-way tie for first place, with another 2800 PR. He later withdrew from the Grand Prix cycle despite his initial success, criticising FIDE for "changing the rules dramatically in the middle of a World Championship cycle".

Carlsen won a rapid match against Peter Leko held in Miskolc, Hungary, scoring 5–3. In June, Carlsen won the annual Aerosvit chess tournament, finishing undefeated with 8/11 in a category 19 field and achieving a PR of 2877, his best PR at that point in his career. Playing in the category 18 Biel Grandmaster Tournament, Carlsen finished third with 6/10, with a PR of 2740.

In the Mainz World Rapid Chess Championship, Carlsen finished in second place after losing the final to defending champion Anand 3–1. In the qualification round Carlsen scored 1½–½ against Judit Polgár, 1–1 against Anand and 1–1 against Alexander Morozevich. In the category 22 Bilbao Masters, Carlsen tied for second with a 2768 PR.

2009 
Playing in Group A of the 71st Corus chess tournament, Carlsen tied for fifth with a 2739 PR. In the Linares chess tournament, Carlsen finished third with a 2777 PR. Carlsen tied for second place with Veselin Topalov at the M-Tel Masters (category 21) tournament in Sofia, Bulgaria. He lost to eventual winner Alexei Shirov in their final game, dropping him from first.

Carlsen won the category 21 Nanjing Pearl Spring tournament, 2½ points ahead of second-place finisher Topalov, the world's highest-rated player at the time. He scored an undefeated 8/10, winning every game as white (against Topalov, Wang Yue, Leko, Teimour Radjabov, and Dmitry Jakovenko), and also winning as black against Jakovenko. By rating performance, this was one of the greatest results in history, with a PR of 3002. Chess statistician Jeff Sonas has declared it one of the 20 best tournament performances of all time, and the best chess performance of all time by a teenager.

In the Tal Memorial, played from 5 to 14 November, Carlsen started with seven straight draws, but finished with wins over former FIDE World Champion Ruslan Ponomariov and Peter Leko. This result put Carlsen in shared second place behind former World Champion Vladimir Kramnik and equal with Ivanchuk. After the Tal Memorial, Carlsen won the World Blitz Championship, played from 16 to 18 November in Moscow, Russia. His score of 28 wins, 6 draws and 8 losses left him three points ahead of Anand, who finished in second place.

Carlsen entered the London Chess Classic as the top seed in a field including Kramnik, Hikaru Nakamura, Michael Adams, Nigel Short, Ni Hua, Luke McShane and David Howell. He defeated Kramnik in round one and went on to win the tournament with 13/21 (three points were awarded for a win, and one for a draw; using classical scoring he finished with 5/7) and a PR of 2844, one point ahead of Kramnik.

Based on his average ranking from the July 2009 and January 2010 FIDE lists, Carlsen qualified for the Candidates Tournament that would determine the challenger to World Champion Viswanathan Anand in the World Chess Championship 2012. In November 2010, however, Carlsen announced he was withdrawing from the Candidates Tournament. Carlsen described the 2008–12 cycle as "[not] sufficiently modern and fair", and wrote that "Reigning champion privileges, the long (five-year) span of the cycle, changes made during the cycle resulting in a new format (Candidates) that no World Champion has had to go through since Kasparov, puzzling ranking criteria as well as the shallow ceaseless match-after-match concept are all less than satisfactory in my opinion."

In early 2009 Carlsen engaged former World Champion Garry Kasparov as a personal trainer. In September their partnership was revealed to the public by Norwegian newspapers.

Responding to a question in an interview with Time magazine in December 2009 as to whether he used computers when studying chess, Carlsen explained that he does not use a chess set when studying on his own.

2010 
Carlsen won the 72nd Corus chess tournament played 16–31 January with 8½ points. His ninth-round loss to Kramnik ended a streak of 36 rated games undefeated. Carlsen appeared to struggle in the last round against Fabiano Caruana, but saved a draw, leaving him half a point ahead of Kramnik and Shirov.

In March it was announced that Carlsen had split from Kasparov and would no longer use him as a trainer, although this was put into different context by Carlsen himself in an interview with the German magazine Der Spiegel, in which he stated that they would remain in contact and he would continue to attend training sessions with Kasparov. In 2011, Carlsen said: "Thanks to [Kasparov] I began to understand a whole class of positions better. ... Kasparov gave me a great deal of practical help." In 2012, when asked what he learnt from working with Kasparov, Carlsen answered: "Complex positions. That was the most important thing."

Carlsen shared first place alongside Ivanchuk in the Amber blindfold and rapid tournament. Scoring 6½/11 in the blindfold and 8/11 in the rapid, Carlsen accumulated 14½ from a possible 22 points. In May it was revealed that Carlsen had helped Anand prepare for the World Chess Championship 2010 against challenger Veselin Topalov, which Anand won 6½–5½ to retain the title. Carlsen had also helped Anand prepare for the World Chess Championships in 2007 and 2008.

Carlsen played in the Bazna Kings Tournament in Romania on 14–25 June. The tournament was a double round robin involving Wang Yue, Boris Gelfand, Ruslan Ponomariov, Teimour Radjabov, and Liviu-Dieter Nisipeanu. He finished with 7½/10 and a 2918 PR, winning the tournament by two points ahead of Radjabov and Gelfand. Carlsen then played in a rapid tournament 28–30 August at the Arctic Securities Chess Stars tournament in Kristiansund, Norway. The field featured World Champion Viswanathan Anand, female world  Judit Polgár, and Jon Ludvig Hammer. In the preliminary round robin, Carlsen scored 3½/6 to qualify for the final, second behind Anand. In the final, Carlsen defeated Anand 1½–½ to win the championship. Following this event, Carlsen suffered setbacks in his next two tournaments. In the 39th Chess Olympiad from 19 September to 4 October, he scored 4½/8, losing three games, to Baadur Jobava, Michael Adams, and Sanan Sjugirov; these were his first losses with the black pieces in more than a year. His team, Norway, finished 51st out of 149 teams.

Carlsen's next tournament was the Grand Slam Masters Final on 9–15 October, which he had qualified for automatically by winning three of the previous year's four Grand Slam chess events (2009 Nanjing Pearl Spring, 2010 Corus, 2010 Bazna Kings). Along with Carlsen, the finals consisted of World Champion Anand and the highest two scorers from the preliminary stage held in Shanghai in September: Kramnik and Shirov. The average Elo of the participants at the time was 2789, making the Grand Slam Final the strongest chess tournament in history. In the first round, Carlsen lost with black to Kramnik; this was Carlsen's second consecutive loss to Kramnik, and placed his hold on the world  ranking in serious jeopardy. In his second round, Carlsen lost with the white pieces to Anand; this was his first loss as White since January 2010. Carlsen recovered somewhat in the latter part of the tournament, achieving a win over Shirov, and finishing with 2½/6. The tournament was won by Kramnik with 4/6. Carlsen finished this tournament with a rating of 2802, two points behind Anand at 2804 who temporarily ended Carlsen's reign at world . These setbacks called into question from some whether Carlsen's activities outside chess, such as modelling for G-Star Raw, were distracting him from performing well at the chessboard. Carlsen said he did not believe there was a direct connection.

Carlsen's next tournament was the Pearl Spring chess tournament on 19–30 October in Nanjing, China, against Anand, Topalov, Vugar Gashimov, Wang Yue, and Étienne Bacrot. This was the only tournament in 2010 to feature Anand, Carlsen and Topalov, at the time the top three players in the world, and was the first tournament in history to feature three players rated at least 2800. With early wins over Bacrot, Wang Yue, and Topalov with white, Carlsen took the early lead, extending his winning streak with white in Nanjing to eight. This streak was halted by a draw to Anand in round seven, but in the penultimate round Carlsen secured first place by defeating Topalov with black. This was his second victory in the tournament over the former world ; his final score of 7/10 (with a PR of 2903) was a full point ahead of runner-up Anand.

On 5 November, Carlsen withdrew from the 2011 Candidates Tournament, having qualified as the highest rated challenger, citing dissatisfaction with the World Championship cycle format.

In the World Blitz Championship, held in Moscow on 16–18 November, Carlsen attempted to defend his 2009 title. With a score of 23½/38, he finished in third place behind Radjabov and winner Levon Aronian. After the tournament, Carlsen played a private 40-game blitz match against Hikaru Nakamura, winning with a score of 24½–15½.

Carlsen won the London Chess Classic on 8–15 December in a field comprising World Champion Anand, Vladimir Kramnik, Nakamura, and British players Adams, Nigel Short, David Howell, and Luke McShane. Carlsen had a rocky start, losing his games to McShane and Anand in rounds 1 and 3, but winning with white against Adams and Nakamura in rounds 2 and 4. He joined the lead with a win over Howell in round 5, and managed to stay in the lead following a harrowing draw against Kramnik in round 6, before defeating Short in the last round. Since the tournament was played with three points for a win, Carlsen's +4−2=1 score put him ahead of Anand and McShane who scored +2=5 (a more traditional two-points-for-a-win system would have yielded a three-way tie, with Carlsen still on top, having the better tiebreaker due to four games with black—Anand and McShane played only three times with black).

2011 
Carlsen competed in the GM-A group of the 73rd Tata Steel Chess Tournament (formerly called the Corus chess tournament) on 14–30 January in Wijk aan Zee in an attempt to defend his title; the field included World Champion Viswanathan Anand, Levon Aronian, former World Champion Vladimir Kramnik, Alexander Grischuk, Hikaru Nakamura, Ruslan Ponomariov, among others. Despite losing games with white against Anish Giri and reigning Russian champion Ian Nepomniachtchi, Carlsen finished with 8/13, including victories over Kramnik and tournament winner Nakamura. Although Carlsen's performance raised his rating from 2814 to 2815, Anand's 8½/13 score elevated his rating to 2817, making him the world  for the March 2011 FIDE rating list.

The first tournament victory of the year came in the Bazna Kings tournament, a double round robin played in Mediaș, Romania on 11–21 June. Carlsen finished with 6½/10, equal with Sergey Karjakin but with a better tiebreak score. Carlsen won his White games against Nakamura, Nisipeanu, and Ivanchuk and drew the rest of the games.

Carlsen won the 44th Biel Grandmaster tournament, held from 16 to 29 July. He took clear first place with a score of 19/30 (+5−1=4; three points for a win) in a field comprising Fabiano Caruana, Maxime Vachier-Lagrave, Alexander Morozevich, Alexey Shirov and Yannick Pelletier, two points ahead of Morozevich. This was Carlsen's second title.

The Grand Slam Chess Final was held as a double round robin with six players, in São Paulo (25 September – 1 October) and Bilbao (5–11 October). Although Carlsen had a slow start, including a loss against bottom-ranked Francisco Vallejo Pons, he finished +3−1=6, equal with Ivanchuk (whose +4−3=3 finish was equal due to three points for a win). Carlsen then won the blitz tiebreak against Ivanchuk. The other players were Anand, Aronian, Nakamura, and Vallejo Pons.

Another tournament victory was achieved in the Tal Memorial in Moscow 16–25 November as a round robin with ten players. Carlsen won two games, against Gelfand and Nakamura, and drew the rest. Although he finished equal on points with Aronian, he placed ahead since the tiebreak was determined by the number of black games; Carlsen had five black games, while Aronian only had four.

In the London Chess Classic, played 3–12 December, Carlsen's streak of tournament victories ended when he finished third, behind Kramnik and Nakamura. Carlsen won three games and drew five. Although he did not win the tournament, Carlsen gained rating points, rising to a new personal record of 2835.

2012 

At the 74th Tata Steel Chess Tournament held on 14–29 January in Wijk aan Zee, Carlsen finished in a shared second place with 8/13, behind Aronian, and equal with Radjabov and Caruana. Carlsen defeated Gashimov, Aronian, Gelfand, and Topalov, but lost against Karjakin. At the blitz chess tournament at Tal Memorial, held in Moscow on 7 June, Carlsen shared first place with Morozevich. In the main event (a category 22 ten-player round robin), he won two games and drew seven. He finished in first place, ahead of Radjabov and Caruana.

Carlsen then went on to finish second in the Biel Grandmaster Tournament, with 18 points, just one point behind Wang Hao using the 3–1–0 scoring system. As in the Tal Memorial earlier in 2012, Carlsen managed to finish the tournament without any losses (+4−0=6). He also defeated the winner Wang in both of their individual games. In the exhibition blitz tournament at Biel before the GM tournament, Carlsen was eliminated (+1−2=0) in the first round by Étienne Bacrot. Bacrot deprived Carlsen of a win in the classical tournament by holding him to a draw in the final round. Carlsen would have won the classical tournament on the traditional 1–½–0 scoring system, with 7/10.

The Grand Slam Chess Final was again held as a double round robin with six players, in São Paulo and Bilbao. Carlsen started with a loss against Caruana, but after three wins in the second (Bilbao) round, finished +4−1=5, equal first with Caruana, and ahead of Aronian, Karjakin and Anand. Carlsen won the tournament by winning both tiebreak games against Caruana.

From 24 to 25 November, Carlsen took part in the chess festival "Segunda Gran Fiesta Internacional de Ajedrez" in Mexico City. As part of it, Carlsen took on an online audience (dubbed as "The World") with the white pieces and won. He then took part in the knockout exhibition event "Cuadrangular UNAM". Carlsen first beat Lázaro Bruzón 1½–½, thus qualifying for a final against Judit Polgár (who had in turn beat Manuel León Hoyos 1½–½). Carlsen lost the first game, but won the second one, and in the tiebreak defeated Polgár 2–0.

Carlsen won the London Chess Classic in December with five wins (over McShane, Aronian, Gawain Jones, Adams and Judit Polgár) and three draws (against Kramnik, Nakamura and Anand). This win, the third time Carlsen had won the tournament in the past four years, increased his rating from 2848 to a new record of 2861, breaking Kasparov's 13-year record of 2851. By rating performance, this was one of the best results in history, with a PR of 2994.

2013 

Carlsen played in the 75th Tata Steel Chess Tournament from 11 to 27 January in Wijk aan Zee. In the 13-round tournament, he scored 10 points (+7−0=6), winning clear first 1½ points ahead of second-place finisher Aronian. On 1 February, Danish GM Peter Heine Nielsen joined the team of assistants who helped Carlsen prepare for the Candidates Tournament in March. Before this, Nielsen was on Viswanathan Anand's team.

Carlsen played in the 2013 Candidates Tournament, which took place in London, from 15 March to 1 April. He finished with +5−2=7, and won the tournament on tiebreak over Vladimir Kramnik. As a result, he earned the right to challenge Anand for the World Championship.

In May, Carlsen played in the first edition of Norway Chess tournament. He finished second, scoring 5½/9 (+3−1=5), half a point behind Sergey Karjakin.

Carlsen played in the Tal Memorial from 12 to 23 June. He finished second, with 5½/9, half a point behind Boris Gelfand. Carlsen ended the tournament with +3−1=5, losing to Caruana but beating Anand, Kramnik and Nakamura. Later that month, Carlsen played a four-game friendly rapid match against Borki Predojević, which he won 2½–1½.

In the Sinquefield Cup, held in September, Carlsen finished first, scoring 4½/6 (+3−0=3), a point ahead of Nakamura.

World Chess Championship 2013 

Carlsen faced Anand in the World Chess Championship 2013, at Hyatt Regency in Chennai, India, from 9 to 22 November. Carlsen won the match 6½–3½ by winning games five, six and nine and drawing the remainder, becoming the new World Chess Champion. Though he was the challenger, and less experienced than Anand, he handled the pressure with ease. He drew first blood in game 5 by taking advantage of a small mistake by Anand, and emerged victorious in games 6 and 9, making him the 16th undisputed World Chess Champion.

{| class="wikitable" style="text-align:center; background:white; color:black"
|+World Chess Championship 2013
|-
! !! Rating !! Rank !! Game 19 Nov. !! Game 210 Nov. !! Game 312 Nov. !! Game 413 Nov. !! Game 515 Nov. !! Game 616 Nov. !! Game 718 Nov. !! Game 819 Nov. !! Game 921 Nov. !! Game 10 22 Nov. !! Game 1124 Nov. !! Game 1226 Nov. !! Points 
|-
| align=left |  || 2775 || 8
| style="background:black; color:white" | ½ || ½ 
| style="background:black; color:white" | ½ || ½ 
| style="background:black; color:white" | 0 || 0 
| ½ || style="background:black; color:white" | ½
| 0 || style="background:black; color:white" | ½ 
|colspan="2" rowspan="2" align="center"|Not required
| 3½
|-
| align=left |  || 2870 || 1
| ½ || style="background:black; color:white" | ½ 
| ½ || style="background:black; color:white" | ½ 
| 1 || style="background:black; color:white" | 1 
| style="background:black; color:white" | ½ || ½
| style="background:black; color:white" | 1 || ½ 
| 6½
|}

2014 
From 29 January to 4 February, Carlsen played in the Zurich Chess Challenge, winning the blitz event (+2−1=2) and the classical event (+3−0=2). He fared worse in the rapid event (+1−2=2), which counted towards the overall standings, but retained enough of a lead to win the tournament. The other players in the event were Aronian, Nakamura, Caruana, Gelfand and Anand. On 22 March, Carlsen played a game for his club Stavanger in the final team match for promotion to the Norwegian Premier League. His win over Vladimir Georgiev helped his team to a 3½–2½ win over Nordstrand.

Carlsen won the Vugar Gashimov Memorial in Şəmkir, Azerbaijan, played from 20 to 30 April. He played in the A group along with Caruana, Nakamura, Karjakin, Shakhriyar Mamedyarov and Radjabov. Carlsen started the tournament with 2/2, beating Mamedyarov and Nakamura. He then drew against Karjakin, only to lose two games in a row for the first time in four years, losing to Caruana with black and then with white to Radjabov. In the second half of the tournament, Carlsen scored 4/5, beating Mamedyarov and Nakamura again, and securing the tournament victory by beating Caruana in the final round, finishing with +5−2=3.

On 8 May, Carlsen played an exhibition game at Oslo City against the people of Norway, assisted by a grandmaster panel consisting of Simen Agdestein, Jon Ludvig Hammer, and Leif Erlend Johannessen. Each of the panel members proposed a move and the public could then vote over the proposed moves. Each panel member was allowed three chances to let chess engine Houdini propose a move during the game. Norway's moves were executed by Oddvar Brå who was disguised in a red spandex suit for the occasion. The game was drawn when Carlsen forced a perpetual check.

From 2–13 June, Carlsen played in the second edition of Norway Chess, a ten-man round robin. He placed second with 5½/9, ½ a point behind the winner Karjakin. Other players in the event were Aronian, Caruana, Topalov, Svidler, Kramnik, Grischuk, Giri and Agdestein.

Carlsen won the FIDE World Rapid Championship, which was held in Dubai from 16 to 19 June. He went on to claim the World Blitz Championship two days later, becoming the first player to simultaneously hold the title in all three FIDE rated time controls.

Carlsen played nine games for Norway in the 41st Chess Olympiad, scoring five wins, two draws, and two losses (against Arkadij Naiditsch and Ivan Šarić).

Carlsen placed second to Fabiano Caruana in the Sinquefield Cup, a six-player double round robin held from 27 August to 7 September. Billed as the strongest chess tournament ever held, the remaining 4 players in the event were Levon Aronian, Hikaru Nakamura, Veselin Topalov, and Maxime Vachier-Lagrave. Carlsen lost to Caruana in round 3 and defeated Aronian and Nakamura in rounds 5 and 7, respectively. He finished the tournament with 5½/10 (+2−1=7), three points behind Caruana.

World Chess Championship 2014 

Carlsen faced Anand in a match for the title of World Chess Champion in 2014. Anand qualified by winning the 2014 Candidates Tournament. The rematch was held from 7 to 23 November in Sochi, Russia. After 11 of 12 games, Carlsen led 6½–4½, thereby defending his World Champion title.

2015 
In January, Carlsen won the 77th Tata Steel Chess Tournament, which was played mainly in Wijk aan Zee on 9–25 January. Carlsen had a poor start to the tournament with two draws and a loss in the third round to Radosław Wojtaszek, which left him in tenth place among the fourteen players. However, a string of six wins in a row thrust Carlsen into clear first place. Drawing the final four games was sufficient to win the tournament with 9 points out of 13, half a point ahead of Anish Giri, Maxime Vachier-Lagrave, Wesley So and Ding Liren.

In February, Carlsen won the 3rd Grenke Chess Classic after a five-game tiebreak with Arkadij Naiditsch. Carlsen had finished joint first with Naiditsch on 4½/7, beating Michael Adams, Anand, and David Baramidze, and losing to Naiditsch in their classical encounter. This tournament victory meant that Carlsen began 2015 by winning two out of two tournaments. Carlsen continued his streak in April, winning Shamkir Chess with a score of 7/9 (+5−0=4), defeating Mamedyarov, Caruana, Vachier-Lagrave, Kramnik, and Rauf Mamedov. With a performance rating of 2983, this was Carlsen's third best tournament result ever, behind only Nanjing 2009 (3002 TPR) and London 2012 (2994 TPR).

Carlsen had a poor result in the third edition of Norway Chess, held 15–26 June. In the first round he obtained a winning position against Topalov after pressing in a long endgame, only to lose on time when he mistakenly thought that he would receive 15 minutes of extra time at move 60. He was then outplayed by Caruana in the second round, missed a win against Anish Giri in round 3, and lost to Anand in round 4. He won against Grischuk in round 5, drew against Nakamura and Vachier-Lagrave in rounds 6 and 7, and defeated Aronian in round 8, but he lost the last round against Jon Ludvig Hammer, leaving him in seventh place and with a performance rating of 2693. Carlsen said of this result: "It's just extremely frustrating not to be able to show anything close to what I am capable of in my home country."

From 22 August to 3 September, Carlsen played in the 2015 Sinquefield Cup. He finished in second place with 5/9 (+3−2=4), one point behind winner Levon Aronian. He defeated the 2014 Sinquefield winner Fabiano Caruana, as well as Maxime Vachier-Lagrave and wild-card Wesley So, but lost to Veselin Topalov and Alexander Grischuk.

In October, Carlsen successfully defended his title in the FIDE World Rapid Championships held in Berlin, as the first World Rapid Champion to do so in history, going +8−0=7. He reached the highest live rapid rating in history after the tournament, and was at that point ranked  in all three disciplines simultaneously. However, Carlsen lost his  blitz ranking after he had a weak second day in the World Blitz Championship, and was unable to retain his World Blitz Champion title, losing it to Alexander Grischuk.

In November, Carlsen participated in the European Team Chess Championship with the Norwegian team. He started off poorly, scoring ½ points out of 3 games, losing to Levon Aronian, drawing against Sune Berg Hansen, and losing again to Yannick Pelletier due to a blunder. However, he finished the tournament strongly, scoring victories against Peter Leko and Radoslaw Wojtaszek, the latter of whom he had lost to earlier in the year, but his performance was not enough to earn his team a medal, and he lost 16 rating points during the event.

From 4–13 December, Carlsen participated in the final leg of the Grand Chess Tour, the London Chess Classic. He scored 5½/9 (+2−0=7) in the event, defeating Nakamura (thus inflicting Nakamura's 12th classical loss to Carlsen) and Grischuk, and finished joint first with Anish Giri and Maxime Vachier-Lagrave. In the 3-way tiebreak, Carlsen was the top seed, meaning he faced the winner of the first tie-break match between Giri and Vachier-Lagrave. Carlsen eventually won the tournament by defeating Vachier-Lagrave, which meant he also won the overall Grand Chess Tour. Carlsen then played in the second edition of the Qatar Masters Open, which was held from 20 to 29 December. He finished joint first with 7/9 (+5−0=4), and defeated Yu Yangyi in a tie-break match to win the tournament.

2016 
From 15 to 31 January, Carlsen participated in the 78th Tata Steel Chess Tournament, held in Wijk Aan Zee. Carlsen won the tournament by scoring 9 points out of 13 (+5−0=8), earning him his 5th Wijk Aan Zee title.

From 18 to 30 April, Carlsen played in the fourth edition of the Norway Chess Tournament. He finished in first place with 6/9 (+4−1=4), half a point ahead of Levon Aronian, and a full point in front of Vladimir Kramnik, Veselin Topalov and Maxime Vachier-Lagrave. This was Carlsen's first Norway Chess victory.

From 17 to 20 June, Carlsen played in the Leuven leg of the Grand Chess Tour. He finished first in the rapid portion of the tournament with 12/18 (+5−2=2; two points for a win) and also first in the blitz portion with 11/18 (+7−3=8) to place first overall with a score of 23/36, two and a half points ahead of the runner-up, Wesley So.

In July, Carlsen won the 9th edition of the Bilbao Masters Final, scoring 17 points out of 10 games (+4−1=5; a win was 3 points, a draw was 1 point). His only loss was to Hikaru Nakamura, who had never beaten Carlsen in classical chess before. Also during this tournament, Carlsen recorded his first victory over Anish Giri in a classical game.

Carlsen played ten games for Norway in the 42nd Chess Olympiad, scoring five wins and five draws, as the Norwegians placed 5th among the 180 teams in the open event.

Carlsen also featured in Chess.com's Grandmaster Blitz Battle Championship. Magnus defeated Tigran L. Petrosian 21 to 4 in the first round, and beat Alexander Grischuk 16 to 8 in the semi-final. On 27 October, he faced Nakamura in the final. Playing both blitz and bullet chess for a total of three hours, Carlsen defeated Nakamura 14½ to 10½ and became the first winner of the Chess.com Grandmaster Blitz Battle Championship.

From 26 to 30 December, Carlsen played in the World Rapid and Blitz Championships held in Doha, Qatar. He scored 11/15 in the rapid tournament, finishing third on tiebreak behind Ivanchuk and Grischuk. In the blitz tournament, he scored 16½/21, finishing second on tiebreak behind Karjakin, and 2 points clear of the rest of the field.

World Chess Championship 2016 

Carlsen faced Sergey Karjakin in the 2016 World Chess Championship in New York City. The 12-game standard match, held between 11 and 28 November, concluded with a 6–6 tie. The match began with seven consecutive draws. Karjakin drew first blood by winning game 8, but Carlsen equalised the match in game 10. Games 11 and 12 were both drawn. The tiebreaking games were held on 30 November, Carlsen's 26th birthday. After drawing games 1 and 2, Carlsen won games 3 and 4 to record a 3–1 victory and retain his World Champion title.

2017 

In January, Carlsen participated in the 79th Tata Steel Chess Tournament. He started well, scoring 2 wins and 4 draws in his first 6 games, but missed mate-in-3 versus Giri in round 7, which Giri described as "the most embarrassing moment" of Carlsen's career. Carlsen then lost in round 8 to Richárd Rapport, and ultimately placed second with 8/13 (+4−1=8), one point behind winner Wesley So.

From 13 to 22 April, Carlsen competed in the 4th Grenke Chess Classic, finishing in joint second place, though third on tiebreaks, with Fabiano Caruana, with a score of 4/7 (+1−0=6). The clear winner with 5½ points (+4−0=3) was Levon Aronian. As a result, Carlsen's FIDE rating dropped to 2832, his lowest since November 2011 (2826).

Carlsen participated in the fifth edition of Norway Chess from 6 to 16 June. Ultimately, he placed ninth in the round-robin tournament with 4/9 (+1−2=6), losing to Aronian and Kramnik and winning against Karjakin. Aronian won the tournament with 6/9 (+3−0=6).

Carlsen played in the Paris leg of the 2017 Grand Chess Tour, which was held from 21 to 25 June. He finished first in the rapid portion of the tournament with 14/18 (+5−0=4; two points for a win) and fifth in the blitz portion with 10/18 (+8−6=4) to place joint first overall with Vachier-Lagrave. Carlsen then defeated Vachier-Lagrave in the playoff to win the tournament.

From 28 June to 2 July, he played in the Leuven leg of the Grand Chess Tour. He won this tournament convincingly, scoring 11/18 (+3−1=5; two points for a win) in the rapid portion and 14½/18 (+12−1=5) in the blitz portion for an overall score of 25½/36, three points ahead of the runner-up, Wesley So. Carlsen's performance rating in the blitz portion of the tournament was 3018, which Garry Kasparov described as "phenomenal". Additionally, Leonard Barden, writing for The Guardian, said the performance was only matched by Fischer's 19/22 score at the 1970 World Blitz Championship.

From 2 to 11 August, Carlsen competed in the Sinquefield Cup, the first classical event of the Grand Chess Tour. He finished joint second with Anand, scoring 5½/9 (+3−1=5). He recorded three victories (against Karjakin, So and Aronian) and his one loss was to Vachier-Lagrave, who won the tournament with 6/9 (+3−0=6). This result left Carlsen in first place in the Grand Chess Tour standings with 34 points, three points ahead of second place Vachier-Lagrave.

In September, he took part in the Chess World Cup 2017. His participation in the event as World Champion was unusual as the World Cup is part of the cycle to challenge the World Champion in 2018. He defeated Oluwafemi Balogun +2−0=0 in the first round to advance to the second round, where he defeated Aleksey Dreev +2−0=0. He was then defeated in the third round by Bu Xiangzhi +0−1=1 and eliminated from the tournament.

On 1 October, Carlsen won the Isle of Man Open, a tournament held from 23 September to 1 October. He scored 7½/9 (+6−0=3), half a point ahead of Nakamura and Anand, for a performance rating of 2903. This was Carlsen's first classical tournament victory in 435 days.

From 9 to 14 November, Carlsen faced Ding Liren in the 2017 Champions Showdown, a match consisting of 10 rapid and 20 blitz games, hosted by the Saint Louis Chess Club. Carlsen won, scoring 22–8 (+16−2=12).

From 1 to 11 December, Carlsen competed in the 2017 London Chess Classic, the final event of the 2017 Grand Chess Tour. He finished fifth, scoring 5/9 (+2−1=6). Caruana shared first place with Nepomniachtchi on 6/9 (+3−0=6) and won the tournament after defeating Nepomniachtchi 2½–1½ in the blitz tiebreak. Carlsen's placing awarded him 7 additional points in the Grand Chess Tour standings, which was enough to crown him the 2017 Grand Chess Tour champion.

From 26 to 30 December, Carlsen played in the 2017 World Rapid and World Blitz Chess Championships, held in Riyadh, Saudi Arabia. He finished fifth in the rapid event, scoring 10/15 (+8−3=4). Anand shared first place with Vladimir Fedoseev on 10½/15, and won the tournament after defeating Fedoseev on tiebreak. Carlsen won the blitz event, scoring 16/21 (+13−2=6), one and a half points ahead of his nearest competitors, Karjakin and Anand. This was Carlsen's third World Blitz Chess Championship victory.

2018 

From October 2017 to January 2018, Carlsen played in the second edition of Chess.com's Speed Chess Championship. He defeated Gadir Guseinov, So and Grischuk in the first three rounds 20½–5½, 27½–9½ and 15½–10½, respectively. On 3 January he defeated Nakamura 18–9 in the final, thus winning the tournament for a second time in a row.

From 13 to 28 January, Carlsen competed in the 80th Tata Steel Chess Tournament. He placed joint first with Giri, scoring 9/13 (+5−0=8). Carlsen then defeated Giri 1½–½ in the blitz playoff, thus winning the tournament for a record sixth time. In February, Carlsen won the unofficial Fischer Random Chess Championship, defeating Nakamura by a score of 14–10.

Carlsen placed second with a score of 5½/9 (+2−0=7) in the 5th Grenke Chess Classic, held from 31 March to 9 April. Caruana won the event with 6½/9 (+4−0=5). Carlsen won the fifth edition of Shamkir Chess, held from 18 to 28 April, finishing clear first with a score of 6/9 (+3−0=6). From 28 May to 7 June, he competed in the sixth edition of Norway Chess, placing second with 4½/8 (+2−1=5), half a point behind winner Caruana. He defeated Caruana and Aronian in rounds 1 and 3, respectively, but lost to So in round 6.

Carlsen participated in the 51st Biel Grandmaster tournament, held from 23 July to 1 August. He finished second on 6/10 (+3−1=6), one-and-a-half points behind the winner Mamedyarov. In August, he competed in the 6th Sinquefield Cup. He tied for first with Caruana and Aronian on 5½/9 (+2−0=7), and jointly won the tournament after the trio decided to share the title. Carlsen represented Vålerenga sjakklubb at the 34th European Chess Club Cup in October. He scored 3½/6 (+1−0=5), as his team finished fifth.

From 26 to 30 December, Carlsen played in the 2018 World Rapid and World Blitz Chess Championships, held in Saint Petersburg, Russia. He lost three of his first eight games—including both of the first two—to significantly lower-rated opponents in the rapid event. Despite a strong recovery, he was unable to attain a medal, placing fifth with 10½/15 (+9−3=3). He defended his blitz title, going unbeaten to finish clear first on a score of 17/21 (+13−0=8).

World Chess Championship 2018 

Carlsen faced Fabiano Caruana in the 2018 World Chess Championship in London. The 12-game match, organised by FIDE, was played between 9 and 28 November. All 12 classical time control games were drawn. Carlsen retained his title by defeating Caruana 3–0 in rapid tiebreak games. Carlsen cited the first rapid game as "critical", and said he felt "very calm" after winning it.

2019 
From 12 to 27 January, Carlsen competed in the 81st Tata Steel Chess Tournament. With a score of 9/13 (+5−0=8), half a point ahead of Giri, he won the tournament for a record-extending seventh time.

Carlsen participated in the sixth edition of Shamkir Chess, held from 31 March to 9 April. He took clear first place with 7/9 (+5−0=4), two points ahead of runner-up Ding. Carlsen said at the event's closing ceremony that it was "one of the best tournaments I've ever played, both in terms of performance and also the quality of the games." Later in April, Carlsen won the 6th Grenke Chess Classic. He took clear first place with 7½/9 (+6−0=3) and increased his rating to 2875.

In early May, Carlsen won the Côte d'Ivoire Rapid & Blitz, the first leg of the 2019 Grand Chess Tour, with a score of 26½/36. In late May, Carlsen won his sixth tournament in a row, winning the Lindores Abbey Chess Stars Tournament. The four-man rapid tournament was a double round-robin. In addition to Carlsen, Anand, Ding, and Karjakin participated. Carlsen's score was 3½/6 (+1−0=5).

In June, he won the seventh edition of Norway Chess. Scoring 13½/18, he finished three points ahead of his nearest competitors. From 26 June to 7 July, Carlsen participated in the second leg of the 2019 Grand Chess Tour, held in Zagreb. He took clear first with 8/11 (+5−0=6), and improved his rating to 2882, equalling his peak set in 2014. This was Carlsen's eighth consecutive tournament victory.

From 10 to 14 August, Carlsen participated in the fourth leg of the 2019 Grand Chess Tour, the St. Louis Rapid & Blitz. He had a poor showing, scoring 8/18 (+3−4=2, points doubled) in rapid and 9/18 (+6−6=6) in blitz for a combined total of 17/36, putting him in sixth place. He said at the end of the first day of blitz: "Everything's going wrong. My confidence is long gone ... At this point I just don't care anymore and I'm just waiting for the classical to start." The fifth leg, the 7th Sinquefield Cup, was a classical tournament. Carlsen won his last two games to tie for first on 6½/11 (+2−0=9) with Ding, but lost the tiebreak 1–3, drawing both rapid games then losing two consecutive blitz games.

At the FIDE Grand Swiss Tournament 2019 held in October on the Isle of Man, Carlsen placed sixth with 7½/11 (+4−0=7). He thus extended his unbeaten streak in classical chess to 101 games, surpassing Ding's record of 100 games. The 101 games consisted of 33 wins and 68 draws.

From 27 October to 2 November, Carlsen played in the first official FIDE World Fischer Random Chess Championship. He was automatically seeded to the semifinal round, as the unofficial Fischer Random Chess champion. He defeated Fabiano Caruana in the semifinals 12½–7½, but lost to Wesley So in the final round 13½–2½. In late November, Carlsen won the Tata Steel Rapid & Blitz, the final leg of the 2019 Grand Chess Tour, with a score of 27/36. At the 2019 London Chess Classic in December, the finals of the 2019 Grand Chess Tour, Carlsen was defeated in the semifinals by Vachier-Lagrave on tie-breaks, 15½–14½. He then went on to beat Levon Aronian to claim third place.

From 26 to 28 December, Carlsen participated in the 2019 World Rapid Chess Championship which he won with a score of 11½/15 (+8-0=7) including no losses to reclaim the title that he lost in 2016. Over the next two days, from 29 to 30 December he took part in the 2019 World Blitz Chess Championship. He won after defeating Hikaru Nakamura in a tiebreak match, drawing the first game with black and winning the second game with the white pieces. His overall score in the tournament was 16½/21 (+13−1=7).

2020 
From 10 to 26 January, Carlsen competed in the 82nd Tata Steel Chess Tournament. He finished in second place with a score of 8/13 (+3−0=10), two points behind the winner Caruana. During the tournament, Carlsen surpassed Sergei Tiviakov's unbeaten streak in classical chess of 110 games.

During the COVID-19 pandemic, which prompted the cancellation of many physical tournaments, Carlsen organized the Magnus Carlsen Invitational along with Chess24. Billed as "the first professional online chess tournament," the eight-player rapid tournament was held from 18 April to 3 May, with a $250,000 prize fund. The first phase consisted of a single round-robin, after which the top four players would advance to the playoffs. Carlsen won the event by defeating Hikaru Nakamura 2½–1½ in the final.

Carlsen competed in the 8th Norway Chess from 5 to 16 October, which was the first elite over-the-board tournament held since social restrictions related to the COVID-19 pandemic were enforced. During the tournament, Carlsen's unbeaten streak in classical chess was ended by Jan-Krzysztof Duda. Carlsen had gone 125 games without defeat, a period spanning 2 years, 2 months and 10 days. He ultimately won the tournament with a round to spare, finishing on 19½ points, one point ahead of runner-up Alireza Firouzja.

2021 
In January, Carlsen participated in the 83rd Tata Steel Chess Tournament. He finished in sixth place with a score of 7½/13, losing one game to young Russian grandmaster Andrey Esipenko. This was Carlsen's first loss to a teenager (at standard time controls) since 2011, and his first loss to a sub-2700 rated player since 2015.

Throughout the year, Carlsen also participated in many online chess tournaments as part of the Meltwater Champions Chess Tour.

At the FIDE World Cup 2021 held in Sochi, Carlsen won the third place match against Fedoseev after being defeated in the semifinals by Duda, who eventually won the event.

Carlsen then won the 9th Norway Chess, again finishing on 19½ points ahead of runner-up Alireza Firouzja. After his sole loss in the fifth round of the classical portion to Karjakin, Carlsen won four straight games in classical chess against Firouzja, Tari, Karjakin, and Rapport before ending the tournament with a classical draw and armageddon win against his future World Championship challenger Ian Nepomniachtchi.

From 26 to 28 December, Carlsen participated in the World Rapid Chess Championship 2021. He took 3rd place (by tiebreakers) with a score of 9½/13 (+7-1=5). Over the next two days, from 29 to 30 December he took part in the World Blitz Chess Championship 2021. He performed poorly, finishing 12th with a score of 13½/21 (+12−6=3).

World Chess Championship 2021 

At the 2021 World Chess Championship, Carlsen defeated challenger Ian Nepomniachtchi in Game 6 after drawing the first five games. It was the first decisive result in a classical time limit World Chess Championship game in more than 5 years and at 136 moves was also the longest game in World Chess Championship history. Subsequently, Carlsen also defeated Nepomniachtchi in Games 8, 9, and 11, thus retaining his championship title. After the match, Carlsen announced that "Unless Firouzja wins the Candidates Tournament, it is unlikely that I will play the next world championship match."

2022 
In January, Carlsen won his eighth Tata Steel Chess Tournament. He finished with a score of 9½/13, with no losses and six wins, including wins against Shakhriyar Mamedyarov and Fabiano Caruana.

In early June, Carlsen placed first in the Norway Chess Tournament, ahead of Shakhriyar Mamedyarov and Viswanathan Anand who finished second and third, respectively. He finished with a score of 16½/30, with no losses and three wins, including wins against Teimour Radjabov, Anish Giri and Shakhriyar Mamedyarov. This was Carlsen's fourth consecutive win of the prestigious super tournament and fifth overall in the last decade.

On 20 July, the deadline FIDE had given him, Carlsen announced that he would not defend his World Championship title against Nepomniachtchi in the 2023 World Chess Championship match. Carlsen said he enjoyed playing chess tournaments more than championships, and would still continue playing professional chess.

Throughout the year, Carlsen competed in the Champions Chess Tour 2022. He won the Airthings Masters, Charity Cup, and FTX Crypto Cup.

Carlsen joined the Norway team for the 44th Chess Olympiad. He was the runner-up in the Chess.com Speed Championship.

Carlsen won the World Rapid Chess Championship 2022 with a score of 10/13 (+8-1=4). He also won the World Blitz Chess Championship 2022 with a score of 16/21 (+13-2=6). This marks the third time in Carlsen's career that he has simultaneously held the Classical, Rapid, and Blitz World Titles, with 2014 and 2019 being the other two occurrences.

Sinquefield Cup withdrawal 

In August and September, Carlsen participated as a wildcard in the 2022 Sinquefield Cup as part of the Grand Chess Tour 2022. He won his first game against Nepomniachtchi, the Candidates Tournament 2022 winner. He subsequently drew his second game to Levon Aronian, leaving him in tied first place with American wildcard Hans Niemann. In the third game, Carlsen was defeated by Niemann, ending his 53-game unbeaten streak in classical chess that chess24 described as a "stunning victory". Carlsen soon after announced his withdrawal in a tweet with a video of Portuguese football manager José Mourinho saying, "I prefer really not to speak. If I speak, I am in big trouble." The New York Times stated that "online observers interpreted Mr. Carlsen's post as insinuating that Mr. Niemann cheated in some way during the game", though no concrete evidence of cheating had been found. Carlsen's previous results still affect his FIDE rating; however, they will be removed from the tournament standing. This was the first time in Carlsen's career to withdraw from a major event in progress, and was considered "virtually unprecedented" in top level chess.

Two weeks later, Carlsen faced Niemann in the Julius Baer Generation Cup, a section of the Champions Chess Tour 2022, an online chess tour. Carlsen, playing as black, resigned after one move, continuing the scandal.  On September 26, Carlsen finally broke his silence and accused Niemann of cheating. Subsequently, on October 20 Niemann filed a lawsuit against Carlsen and four other defendants, alleging five counts of action, including libel and slander.

2023
In January, Carlsen participated in the Tata Steel Chess Tournament. He lost two games in a row, which had not happened since 2015, first to Anish Giri and then to the young Uzbek prodigy Nodirbek Abdusattorov. He recovered and finished 3rd, with the same score as Abdusattorov, but behind Giri, who won the tournament. In February, Carlsen participated in the Airthings Masters 2023 which he won by defeating the American Grandmaster Hikaru Nakamura in the finals.

Tournament and match results 

TPR (Tournament Performance ratings) of FIDE-rated events calculated according to FIDE.

2006–2020

Since 2021

Honours 
Carlsen won the Chess Oscars from 2009 to 2013. The Chess Oscar, organised by the Russian chess magazine 64, was awarded to the year's best player according to a worldwide poll of leading chess critics, writers, and journalists, but it was no longer awarded after 2013, as 64 ceased publication.

The Norwegian tabloid Verdens Gang (VG) has awarded Carlsen the "Name of the Year" (Årets navn) twice, in 2009 and 2013. VG also named him "Sportsman of the Year" in 2009. Carlsen has also won the Folkets Idrettspris, a people's choice award from the Norwegian newspaper Dagbladet, in 2009 and 2010.

In 2011, he was awarded the Peer Gynt Prize, a Norwegian prize awarded annually to "a person or institution that has achieved distinction in society".

In 2013, Time magazine named Carlsen one of the 100 most influential people in the world.

Rating 

In the January 2006 FIDE rankings, at the age of 15 years and 32 days, Carlsen attained a 2625 Elo rating, which made him the youngest person to surpass 2600 (the record has since been broken by Wesley So, Wei Yi, and John M. Burke). In the July 2007 FIDE rankings, at the age of 16 years and 213 days, Carlsen attained a 2710 Elo rating, which made him the youngest person to surpass 2700 (the record has since been broken by Wei Yi).

On 5 September 2008, after winning in round 4 of the Bilbao Masters, Carlsen, aged 17 years and 280 days old, briefly became  on the unofficial live ratings list. Carlsen's victory in the 2009 Nanjing Pearl tournament raised his FIDE rating to 2801, making him, aged 18 years and 336 days, at the time the youngest player ever to surpass 2800 (a record subsequently broken by Alireza Firouzja). The youngest before Carlsen to achieve this feat was Vladimir Kramnik at the age of 25, and up until this point only Kasparov, Topalov, Kramnik, and Anand had achieved a 2800+ rating.

The FIDE rankings in January 2010 recorded Carlsen's rating at 2810, which made him  rated player in the world. This meant that Carlsen became, at the age of 19 years and 32 days, the youngest ever world , as well as the first player from a Western nation to reach the top of the FIDE rankings since Bobby Fischer in 1971.

The March 2010 FIDE rankings showed Carlsen with a new peak rating of 2813, a figure that only Kasparov had bettered at that time. On the January 2013 FIDE rankings, Carlsen reached 2861, thus surpassing Garry Kasparov's 2851 record from July 1999. In the May 2014 rankings, Carlsen achieved an all-time high record of 2882, with a peak of 2889 on the live ratings list achieved on 21 April 2014. In August 2019 he equalled his peak FIDE rating of 2882.

Playing style 
Carlsen had an aggressive style of play as a youth, and, according to Simen Agdestein, his play was characterised by "a fearless readiness to offer material for activity". As he matured, Carlsen found that this risky playing style was not as well suited against the elite of the chess world. When he started playing in top tournaments, he had trouble getting much out of the opening. To progress, Carlsen's style became more universal, capable of handling all sorts of positions well. He opens with both 1.d4 and 1.e4, as well as 1.c4, and, on occasion, 1.Nf3, thus making it harder for opponents to prepare against him and reducing the effect of computer analysis. He said in 2015 that the middlegame is his favourite part of the game as it comes down to "pure chess".

In a 2016 interview, Anish Giri said: "Magnus and I are very close in terms of style, but in our approach to the game we're total opposites. Magnus tries to put the accent only on play, getting away from preparation, but for me preparation plays an enormous role."

In a 2013 interview, Peter Heine Nielsen said: "The days of big novelties are over, and that fits Magnus' style well." According to Carlsen, however, he does not have any preferences in playing style. Kasparov said in 2013 that "Carlsen is a combination of Karpov [and] Fischer. He gets his positions [and] then never lets go of that bulldog bite. Exhausting for opponents." Carlsen has also stated that he follows in the traditions of Karpov and Fischer, but additionally mentions Reuben Fine as a player who "was doing in chess similar to what I am doing".

Anand said of Carlsen in 2012: "Magnus has an incredible innate sense. ... The majority of ideas occur to him absolutely naturally. He's also very flexible, he knows all the structures and he can play almost any position." He also compared Carlsen to Boris Spassky in his prime, and stated that "Magnus can literally do almost everything." Kasparov expressed similar sentiments: "[Carlsen] has the ability to correctly evaluate any position, which only Karpov could boast of before him."
When asked in a 2016 interview whether Carlsen's style resembles his own, Karpov answered: "It is quite possible. He grew up when I was in power, and perhaps he studied my games. He can convert a minimal advantage into a real one."

In a 2012 interview, Vladimir Kramnik stated that Carlsen's "excellent physical shape" was a contributing factor to his success against other top players as it prevents "psychological lapses", which enables him to maintain a high standard of play over long games and at the end of tournaments, when the energy levels of others have dropped. Levon Aronian said in 2015: "Magnus' main secret is his composure and the absence of any soul-searching after mistakes during a game."
Tyler Cowen gave a point of view on Carlsen's playing style: "Carlsen is demonstrating one of his most feared qualities, namely his 'nettlesomeness,' to use a term coined for this purpose by Ken Regan, of the University at Buffalo. Using computer analysis, you can measure which players do the most to cause their opponents to make mistakes. Carlsen has the highest nettlesomeness score by this metric, because his creative moves pressure the other player and open up a lot of room for mistakes. In contrast, a player such as Kramnik plays a high percentage of very accurate moves, and of course he is very strong, but those moves are in some way calmer and they are less likely to induce mistakes in response."

Carlsen's endgame prowess has been described as among the greatest in history. Jon Speelman, analysing several of Carlsen's endgames from the 2012 London Classic (in particular, his wins against McShane, Aronian, and Adams), described what he calls the "Carlsen effect": ... through the combined force of his skill and no less important his reputation, he drives his opponents into errors. ... He plays on for ever, calmly, methodically and, perhaps most importantly of all, without fear: calculating superbly, with very few outright mistakes and a good proportion of the "very best" moves. This makes him a monster and makes many opponents wilt.

An artificial intelligence approach, designed by Jean-Marc Alliot of the Institut de recherche en informatique de Toulouse ("Toulouse Computer Science Research Institute"), which compares chess grandmaster moves against that of Stockfish—a chess engine that outperforms all human opponents—rated Carlsen as the best player of all time as he had the highest probability among all World Chess Champions to play the moves which Stockfish suggested.

Carlsen also plays speed chess online under many screen names. He is known for meme openings such as the Bongcloud Attack and exceptionally strong play, despite banter and gags.

Notable games 
 Carlsen vs. Garry Kasparov, Reykjavík Rapid (2004), Queen's Gambit Declined: Cambridge Springs Defense (D52), . At the age of just 13 years, Carlsen had serious winning chances in a rapid game against Kasparov, who was ranked  in the world at that time.
 Carlsen vs. Veselin Topalov, M-Tel Masters (2009), Semi-Slav Defense: General (D43), . This was Carlsen's first win against a 2800+ player.
 Carlsen vs. Boris Gelfand, Tal Memorial (2011), Slav Defense: Quiet Variation. Schallopp Defense (D12), 1–0. The  Israeli player creates a seemingly decisive rook invasion into White's , but Carlsen vanquishes the threats. Carlsen called it "one of the most interesting games I have played in recent times".
 Carlsen vs. Hikaru Nakamura, London Chess Classic (2011), Italian Game: Classical Variation. Giuoco Pianissimo (C53), 1–0. Facing the  American player, Carlsen sacrifices the exchange to achieve a winning position in an otherwise near-equal game. 
 Carlsen vs. Viswanathan Anand, Bilbao Masters (2012), Sicilian Defense: Canal Attack. Main Line (B52), 1–0. Playing against the then-World Champion, Carlsen sacrifices a pawn to leave Black with a  position, which leads to Anand's  at move 30. Carlsen stated in 2013 that he considers this game to be one of his very best.
 Carlsen vs. Li Chao, Qatar Masters (2015), Neo-Grünfeld Defence: Goglidze Attack (D70), 1–0. Playing against one of the leading Chinese GMs, Carlsen finds a winning attack by sacrificing his queen in a  position.
 Carlsen vs. Ian Nepomniachtchi, 2021 World Championship game 6 (2021), Queen's Pawn Game, Symmetrical Variation, Pseudo-Catalan, 1–0. Game 6 was a 136-move win for Carlsen that lasted 7 hours 45 minutes. , it is the longest game in the history of the World Chess Championship, surpassing the previous record, a 124-move draw in game 5 of the World Chess Championship 1978 between Anatoly Karpov and Viktor Korchnoi.

Other business endeavours 

Carlsen modelled for G-Star Raw's Fall/Winter 2010 advertising campaign along with American actress Liv Tyler. The campaign was shot by Dutch film director and photographer Anton Corbijn. The campaign was coordinated with the RAW World Chess Challenge in New York, an event in which Carlsen played an online team of global chess players, who voted on moves suggested by Maxime Vachier-Lagrave, Hikaru Nakamura and Judit Polgár. Carlsen, playing white, won in 43 moves. In February 2014, he appeared in G-Star Raw's Spring/Summer 2014 campaign along with actress and model Lily Cole.

Film director J. J. Abrams offered Carlsen a role in the movie Star Trek Into Darkness as "a chess player from the future", but Carlsen was unable to get a work permit in time for shooting. In 2012, Carlsen was featured in a 60 Minutes segment and appeared as a guest on The Colbert Report. He was also interviewed by Rainn Wilson for SoulPancake in 2013.

, Carlsen is the only active chess professional with a full-time manager; Espen Agdestein, a FIDE Master and brother of Carlsen's former trainer Simen Agdestein, began working as an agent for Carlsen in late 2008. Agdestein's work consisted initially of finding sponsors and negotiating media contacts but, since 2011, he has taken over management tasks formerly performed by Carlsen's father Henrik. According to The New York Times, Carlsen earned US$1.2 million in 2012, the bulk of which was from sponsorships.

In August 2013, Carlsen became an ambassador for Nordic Semiconductor, and in November was selected as one of the "sexiest men of 2013" by Cosmopolitan. In 2017, Carlsen made a special guest appearance on The Simpsons in an episode where Homer's chess history is revealed. In 2020, Carlsen announced that he had signed a two-year sponsorship deal with gambling company Unibet to act as a "global ambassador".  Unibet parent company Kindred Group is also a sponsor of Offerspill Chess Club.  Offerspill was founded by Carlsen in 2019 after the Norwegian Chess Federation turned down Kindred's sponsorship offer.  It is now Norway's largest chess club; Carlsen is its current chairman. In April 2022, the Kindred Group (through Unibet) extended its partnership with Carlsen for another two years, and also extended its sponsorship of Offerspill.

Play Magnus

In October 2013, Carlsen co-founded a company, Play Magnus AS, with Espen Agdestein and Anders Brandt. Based in Oslo, Norway, Play Magnus' first product was an iOS app, called Play Magnus, that allows the user to play a chess engine created using a database of thousands of Carlsen's recorded games from the age of five and up. Carlsen stated he wished for the app to encourage more people to play chess. 

In March 2019, Play Magnus AS merged with Chess24.com, consolidating into the Play Magnus Group. On 8 October 2020, Play Magnus Group was listed on the Oslo Stock Exchange. Magnus Chess, an entity controlled by Carlsen and his family, then owned 9.5% of Play Magnus Group. 

In August 2022, Chess.com finalised an offer of acquisition for Play Magnus Group, which officially closed on December 16, 2022. As part of the acquisition, Carlsen signed as a brand ambassador for Chess.com.

Personal life 
As of 2016, Carlsen identifies as a social democrat and mostly follows a vegetarian diet; two of his sisters are vegetarians.

Carlsen is an avid fan of football, with Real Madrid CF as his favourite club. In recognition of becoming world chess champion, he took the honorary kick-off in a La Liga game between Real Madrid and Real Valladolid on 30 November 2013. Carlsen also follows the Premier League and plays fantasy football. In December 2019, he reached the  spot on a Fantasy Premier League game, ahead of seven million other players, before eventually finishing the season in 10th place.

In April 2022, Carlsen played poker at the Norwegian Championships Main Event and finished 25th out of 1050 players.

Books and films 
 Grandmaster Zenon Franco (2020). Magnus Wins With White. [Limited Liability Company Elk and Ruby Publishing House]. .
 Grandmaster Zenon Franco (2020). Magnus Wins With Black. [Limited Liability Company Elk and Ruby Publishing House]. .
 Valaker, O; Carlsen, M. (2004). Lær sjakk med Magnus [Learn Chess with Magnus]. Gyldendal Norsk Forlag. .
 The Prince of Chess, a film about Magnus Carlsen (2005). Directed by Øyvind Asbjørnsen.
 Opedal, Hallgeir (2011). Smarte trekk. Magnus Carlsen: Verdens beste sjakkspiller [Smart Moves. Magnus Carlsen: The World's Best Chess Player]. Kagge. .
 Mikhalchishin, Adrian; Stetsko, Oleg. (2012). Fighting Chess with Magnus Carlsen (Progress in Chess). Edition Olms. .
 Crouch, Colin (2013). Magnus Force: How Carlsen Beat Kasparov's Record. Everyman Chess. .
 Sivertsen, Aage G. (2015). Magnus Kagge Forlag. .
 Kotronias, Vassilios & Logothetis, Sotiris (2013). Carlsen's assault on the throne. Quality Chess. .
 Butler, Brin-Jonathan (2018). The Grandmaster: Magnus Carlsen and the Match That Made Chess Great Again. .
 Magnus (2016).

Notes: interactive games

See also
 List of chess players by peak FIDE rating
 Carlsen-Nakamura rivalry

Notes

References

Sources

External links 

 
 
 
  
 
 Magnus Carlsen chess games at 365Chess.com
 Books about Leading Modern Chessplayers – by Edward Winter
 
 

 
1990 births
Living people
Norwegian chess players
World chess champions
Chess grandmasters
Chess Olympiad competitors
Norwegian male models
Norwegian social democrats
Sportspeople from Tønsberg
Sportspeople from Bærum